United Nations Security Council Resolution 50, adopted on May 29, 1948, called upon all governments and authorities involved in the conflict in Palestine to order a cessation of all acts of armed force of four weeks, to refrain from introducing any fighting personnel into Palestine, Egypt, Iraq, Lebanon, Saudi Arabia, Syria, Transjordan or Yemen during the cease-fire, to refrain from importing or exporting war material into or to Palestine, Egypt, Iraq, Lebanon, Saudi Arabia, Syria, Transjordan or Yemen during the cease-fire.

The resolution further urged all governments and authorities to do all in their power to ensure the safety of the Holy Places in the area as well as the city of Jerusalem and to ensure free access to them.  Instructed the United Nations Mediator in Palestine to make contact with all the parties involved to see that the truce is carried out and offered him as many military observers as would be necessary to that end.  The resolution decided that if the conditions set in it and previous resolutions were violated the Council would reconsider the matter with a view to action under Chapter VII of the United Nations Charter.

The resolution was adopted in parts; no voting took place on the resolution as a whole.

See also
List of United Nations Security Council Resolutions 1 to 100 (1946–1953)
United Nations Truce Supervision Organization

References
Text of Resolution at undocs.org

External links

 0050
 0050
1948 Arab–Israeli War
 0050
 0050
 0050
 0050
 0050
 0050
 0050
1948 in Syria
1948 in Israel
1948 in Lebanon
1948 in Iraq
1948 in Jordan
Kingdom of Yemen
1948 in Saudi Arabia
1948 in Egypt
1948 in Mandatory Palestine
May 1948 events